Slovenia is a European Parliament constituency for elections in the European Union covering the member state of Slovenia. It is currently represented by eight Members of the European Parliament.

Members of the European Parliament

Elections

2004

The 2004 European election was the sixth election to the European Parliament. As Slovenia had only joined the European Union earlier that month, it was the first European election held in that state. The election took place on 13 June 2004. The biggest surprise was the victory of the New Slovenia party over the Liberal Democracy of Slovenia and the defeat of the Slovene People's Party, which did not win a seat. The parties on the right of centre that form the opposition in the Slovenian national parliament won this election.

2009

The 2009 European election was the seventh election to the European Parliament and the second for Slovenia. The number of seats was increased to eight.

2014

The 2014 European election was the eighth election to the European Parliament and the third for Slovenia.

2019

The 2019 European election was the ninth election to the European Parliament and the fourth for Slovenia.

References

External links
 European Election News by European Election Law Association (Eurela)
 List of MEPs europarl.europa.eu

European Parliament elections in Slovenia
European Parliament constituencies
2004 establishments in Slovenia
Constituencies established in 2004